Iqbal Day is the birthday of Muhammad Iqbal on 9 November. The day was a public holiday in all provinces and federal administrative areas of Pakistan until 2018.  The Prime Minister Shehbaz Sharif Again restored public holiday in 2022. Iqbal, a poet and philosopher, was a great inspiration for the Pakistan Movement.

History of Muhammad Iqbal

Iqbal day is organized and celebrated on 9 November every year in all the provinces as a tribute to Allama Muhammad Iqbal, the "Poet of the East". Iqbal was born on 9 November 1877 in Sialkot, within the Punjab Province of British India (now in Pakistan). He died on 21 April 1938 in Lahore, Punjab, British India. The Government of Pakistan has officially declared him the national poet.

See also
 Independence Day (Pakistan)
 Pakistan Resolution
 Allahabad Address
 World Urdu Day

References

External links
 How to Read Iqbal
 Iqbal Day 9 November by International Iqbal Society
 Iqbal Day 9 November 

Public holidays in Pakistan
Festivals in Pakistan
Memorials to Muhammad Iqbal